This article is a list of countries by median age.

Methodology 
The median age is the index that divides the entire population into two numerically equal age groups, one younger than that age and the other older than that age. It is the only index associated with the age distribution of a population.

Currently, the median age ranges from a low of about 18 or less in most Least Developed countries to 40 or more in most European countries, Canada, Japan, Taiwan, and South Korea. The median age of women tends to be much greater than that of men in some of the ex-Soviet republics, while in the Global South, the difference is far smaller or is reversed.

In this article, two sets of data based on Central Intelligence Agency (CIA) and United Nations (UN) estimates are provided.

CIA figures

UN figures

See also
 Population pyramid
 List of U.S. states and territories by median age

References

External links
Chart: Compare the average age in each U.S. state, 2005–2014 Denver Post online article

Demographic lists
Median age
Median age